Johnny Grant is an American politician. He most recently served as a Republican Georgia State Senator representing the 25th district of Georgia. His district included the counties of: Baldwin, Butts, Greene, Hancock, Jasper, Jones (Pt.), Morgan, Putnam, Taliaferro, Warren (Pt.). Grant was first elected to the state legislature in 2004.

Early life and education 
Grant is a graduate of Georgia Tech and has a Masters from Georgia College & State University in public administration.

Career 
Grant won re-election in 2006–2010. He was defeated in the Republican Primary in 2012.

References

External links
 Johnny Grant

Republican Party Georgia (U.S. state) state senators
Georgia Tech alumni
Year of birth missing (living people)
Living people
21st-century American politicians